Every Blessed Day is a 2012 Italian romantic comedy film directed by Paolo Virzì.

Cast 
 Luca Marinelli as Guido
 Thony as Antonia
 Micol Azzurro as Patrizia
 Katie McGovern as Katherine 
 Claudio Pallitto as Marcello
 Stefania Felicioli as the gynecologist
 Franco Gargia as Professor Savarese
 Giovanni La Parola as Jimmy
 Frank Crudele as Antonia's father
 Mimma Pirré as Rosetta, Antonia's mother

References

External links 
 

2012 films
Italian romantic comedy-drama films
2012 romantic comedy-drama films
Films set in Rome
Films directed by Paolo Virzì
2012 comedy films
2012 drama films
2010s Italian films